The following is a list of active United States military land vehicles grouped by type of land vehicle.

Main battle tank

 M1 Abrams – 5,000 active use. Approx. 3,000 stored.
 M1A1 AIM.V2/SA
 M1A2B and M1A2C

Infantry fighting vehicles

 Bradley Fighting Vehicle – 6,724
 M3A3 Bradley
 M7 Bradley Fire Support Vehicle (B-FiST)
 Bradley Engineer Squad Vehicle (ESV)
 Bradley Battle Command Vehicle (BCV)

Armored personnel carriers

 Stryker 4,466
 M1126 Infantry Carrier Vehicle (ICV) M1126 STRYKER (IAV) has two variants.
 The Infantry Carrier Vehicle (ICV) and the Mobile Gun System (MGS).The (ICV) variant has eight additional configurations: Mortar Carrier (MC), Reconnaissance Vehicle (RV), Commanders Vehicle (CV), Fire Support Vehicle (FSV), Medical Evacuation Vehicle (MEV), Engineer Squad Vehicle (ESV), Anti-tank Guided Missile Vehicle (ATGM), and NBC Reconnaissance Vehicle (NBCRV).
 M1296 "Dragoon" - All M1126 vehicles will be converted to this standard or attached with 4 Hellfire missiles.
 M1127 Reconnaissance Vehicle (RV)
 M1128 Mobile Gun System (MGS)
 M1129 Mortar Carrier (MC)
 M1130 Command Vehicle (CV)
 M1131 Fire Support Vehicle (FSV)
 M1132 Engineer Squad Vehicle (ESV)
 M1133 Medical Evacuation Vehicle (MEV)
 M1134 Anti-Tank Guided Missile Vehicle (ATGMV)
 M1135 Nuclear, Biological, Chemical, Reconnaissance Vehicle (NBC RV)
 M113 armored personnel carrier – 6,000
 M58 Wolf
 M113A3 APC
 M113 Armored Medical Evacuation Vehicle (AMEV)
 M548A3 Cargo Carrier
 M577A3 Medical Vehicle
 M901A3 Improved TOW Vehicle (ITV)
 M1059A3 Lynx Smoke Generator Carrier (SGC)
 M1064A3 Mortar Carrier
 M1068A3 Standard Integrated Command Post System (SICPS) Carrier
 LAV-25 – (light armored vehicle) 870
 LAV-25A2
 LAV-AT (Anti-Tank)
 LAV-M (Mortar)
 LAV-R (Recovery)
 LAV-C2 (Command & Control)
 LAV-LOG (Logistics)
 LAV-MEWSS (Mobile Electronic Warfare Support System)
 Assault Amphibious Vehicle 1,311
 AAVP-7A1 (Personnel)
 AAVC-7A1 (Command)
 AAVR-7A1 (Recovery)
 LARC-V (amphibious resupply cargo) 200
 Bison (armoured personnel carrier) 12
 Pandur I 50
 M93 Fox NBCRV – 123

Armored combat support vehicles
 M1 Assault Breacher Vehicle – 39
 M4 Command and Control Vehicle (C2V) – 25
 M9 Armored Combat Earthmover – 447
 M60A1 AVLB – 125
 M88A2 Hercules
 M104 Wolverine – 44

Mine-protected vehicles
 RG-31 –
 RG-33 – 1,735
 Cougar – 3,500
 International MaxxPro – 9,000
 BAE Caiman – 2,800
 Oshkosh M-ATV – 8,700
 Buffalo– 200
 JERRV
 Husky VMMD

Light armored vehicles

 Humvee – ≈160,000  

 M997A3 Ambulance
 M1097A2 Unarmored Cargo/Troop/Air-defense Carrier
 M1114 Up-Armored Armament Carrier
 M1116 Up-Armored Armament Carrier
 M1145 Up-Armored Armament Carrier
 M1151A1 Up-Armored Armament Carrier
 M1152A1 Up-Armored Cargo/Troop Carrier
 M1165A1 Up-Armored Command and Control Carrier
 M1167A1 Up-Armored TOW Carrier
 Ground Mobility Vehicle
 General Dynamics Flyer
 M1117 Armored Security Vehicle – 1,836
 M1200 Armored Knight

Light utility vehicles

 Light Combat Tactical Utility Vehicle (L-ATV)
 Army Ground Mobility Vehicle (AGMV)
 Desert Patrol Vehicle
 Light Strike Vehicle
 Advanced Light Strike Vehicle
 Ranger Special Operations Vehicle
 Interim Fast Attack Vehicle 157
 Guardian Angel Air-Deployable Rescue Vehicle
 M1161 Light Strike. Vehicle (LSV)
 M1163 Expeditionary Fire Support System (EFSS) Prime Mover
 Grader
 Wheel tractor-scraper
 Backhoe
 Churchill II D7
 John Deere 850J Medium Crawler Tractor (MCT)
 Caterpillar D9
 M816 Wrecker
 MRZR-D (USMC)
 Infantry Squad Vehicle (ISV) - 649 on order

Self-propelled artillery
 M109A6 Paladin 850 
(155 mm howitzer motor carriage; full-track)
 M142 HIMARS 500
 M270A1 MLRS 991

Anti-aircraft
 M1097 Avenger – 1,400
 Terminal High Altitude Area Defense – 7 Battery
 MIM-104 Patriot
 Iron Dome ( limited use ) Indirect Fires Protection Capability

Prime movers and trucks
 Medium Tactical Vehicle Replacement – 7,500
 LARC-V
 Heavy Equipment Transport System
 M35 2½ ton cargo truck
 M939 Truck – 32,000
 M970
 Family of Medium Tactical Vehicles – 80,000
 Heavy Expanded Mobility Tactical Truck – 13,000
 Logistics Vehicle System
 Palletized Load System
 Commercial Utility Cargo Vehicle
 R-11 Refueler
 Gun Truck
 Oshkosh M1070

Miscellaneous
 M-Gator
 M973 (carrier, cargo) Small Unit Support Vehicle (SUSV)
 M1065 (carrier, command post)
 M1066 (carrier, ambulance)
 M1067 (carrier, cargo) (flatbed)
 M1030M1 Motorcycle
 Forklift truck
 Oshkosh Striker
 Rhino Runner
 Mamba APC
 Wiesel 1 – 7
 Ford F-Series
 Chevy Tahoe
 Dragon Runner
 iRobot 510 Packbot
 XM1216 Small Unmanned Ground Vehicle
 iRobot 110 FirstLook
 iRobot 710 Warrior
 Foster-Miller TALON
 MARCbot IV
 Remotec ANDROS
 iRobot R-Gator
 Squad Mission Support System (SMSS)
 M160

Experimental vehicles
 Joint Light Tactical Vehicle (JLTV)
 Amphibious Combat Vehicle (ACV)
 Armored Multi-Purpose Vehicle (AMPV)
 Modular Advanced Armed Robotic System (MAARS)
 Black Knight (Unmanned Combat Vehicle) – prototype only
 M1299 ( ERCA )
 Griffin ( MPF ) ( Armoured fighting vehicle )
 M5 Ripsaw ( Vehicle Robot )
 Multi-Mission Launcher ( Indirect Fire Protection Capability Increment 2-Intercept )
 Long-Range Hypersonic Weapon ( Intermediate-Range Conventional Prompt Strike (IRCPS) )
 Integrated Air and Missile Defense ( IAMD )

See also
 Currently active military equipment by country
 Vehicle registration plates of the United States Army in Germany
 M-numbers
 List of land vehicles of the U.S. Armed Forces
 List of crew-served weapons of the U.S. Armed Forces
 List of vehicles of the United States Marine Corps
 List of weapons of the U.S. Marine Corps

References

United States
U.S. armed forces
United States, currently active military vehicles
U.S armed forces, vehicles